Lake Mohawk is a census-designated place (CDP) in Brown and Harrison townships of Carroll County, Ohio, United States, developed around Lake Mohawk, a reservoir. The population of the CDP was 1,652 as of the 2010 census.

History
Lake Mohawk was founded in 1963 by property developers as a planned community.

Geography
The Lake Mohawk community is situated on both sides of Lake Mohawk, a small reservoir on Middle Creek, a tributary of Sandy Creek, part of the Tuscarawas River watershed flowing to the Ohio River. The majority of the lake and community are in Brown Township, with the upstream end of the lake extending south into Harrison Township.

The lake is inside a gated community which contains approximately 1,700 property lots that are privately owned.

Demographics

References

Census-designated places in Carroll County, Ohio